Buchy is the name or part of the name of the following communes in France:

 Buchy, Moselle, in the Moselle department
 Buchy, Seine-Maritime, in the Seine-Maritime department
 Bosc-Roger-sur-Buchy, in the Seine-Maritime department
 Ernemont-sur-Buchy, in the Seine-Maritime department
 Sainte-Croix-sur-Buchy, in the Seine-Maritime department